Newbyres Castle was a 16th-century tower house, in Gorebridge, Midlothian, Scotland, west of the main street.
The tower occupied a roughly triangular position, which was naturally defended by deeply worn water-courses.

History
In 1543 Michael Borthwick of Glengelt acquired the land from James, Abbot of Newbattle, with the consent of the abbey’s patroness, Mary, Queen of Scots, and built the property; the castle was purchased by Sir James Dundas of Arniston in 1624.

By the early 20th century Newbyres was in an unsound, ruinous condition, and the local council demolished it in 1963 for reasons of 'public safety'.

Structure

In the early 20th century the walls of the main block facing west and north were complete to the wall-head, the rest being fragmentary. There seems to have been a courtyard wall.

The building was rubble-built with freestone quoins; the tower was vaulted, rising from a basement course.  There was a boldly projecting corbelled parapet equipped with rounds. There were numerous gun-loops, four at ground level and two at the second floor. The unusual cap-house to the projecting entrance wing collapsed in February 1881.

There was an armorial panel bearing the Borthwick arms.

The remaining structure is a scheduled monument, regarded as of national importance because it provides evidence and has the potential to provide further evidence for the study of the defensive architecture and domestic life of the minor gentry in mid-sixteenth-century Scotland.

See also
Castles in Great Britain and Ireland
List of castles in Scotland

References

Castles in Midlothian
Scheduled Ancient Monuments in Midlothian
Demolished buildings and structures in Scotland
Buildings and structures demolished in 1963